is a private university in Okazaki, Aichi, Japan. The predecessor of the school was founded in 1948, and it was chartered as a university in 1992.

External links
 Official website 

Educational institutions established in 1948
Private universities and colleges in Japan
Universities and colleges in Aichi Prefecture
1948 establishments in Japan
Okazaki, Aichi